Stork was an ancient Egyptian ruler (pharaoh) from the pre-dynastic period of Egypt. Most modern scholars doubt that he ever existed.

Very little is known of his rule due to a paucity of archeological evidence and a lack of written records. The dates and geographic extent of his rule are not known. His actual name is unknown though he used the stork hieroglyph to denote himself.

References

32nd-century BC Pharaohs
People whose existence is disputed
Year of birth unknown
Year of death unknown